Valeria Messalina (c.17/20-48) was a Roman Empress as the third wife of Emperor Claudius.

Messalina can also refer to:
 Statilia Messalina (c. 35-68), Roman Empress as the third wife of Emperor Nero
 Saint Messalina, see Felician of Foligno (died 250 AD)
 Caroline Stanhope, Countess of Harrington (1722-1784), British socialite nicknamed Stable Yard Messalina
 545 Messalina, a minor planet orbiting the Sun
 Messalina (1924 film), an Italian film
 Messalina (1930 film), a Brazilian film directed by Luiz de Barros
 Messalina (1951 film), directed by Carmine Gallone
 Messalina (1960 film), an Italian film
 Messalina (English translation of Messaline, 1901 novel of ancient Rome by Alfred Jarry)